Slope or gradient of a line describes its steepness, incline, or grade, in mathematics.

Slope may also refer to:
Slope landform, a type of landform
Grade (slope) of a topographic feature or constructed element
Piste, a marked track for snow skiing or snowboarding
Roof pitch, a steepness of a roof
Slope (album), a 2007 album by Steve Jansen
Slope (ethnic slur), a pejorative for Asian people

See also
Park Slope, a neighborhood in Brooklyn, New York City
Slope County, North Dakota
Slope rating in golf
Slope stability
Slope stability analysis